Božići may refer to:

 Božići (Kozarska Dubica), a village in Bosnia and Herzegovina
 Božići, Fojnica, a village in Bosnia and Herzegovina
 Božići, Novi Travnik, a village in Bosnia and Herzegovina
 Božići (Srebrenica), a village in Bosnia and Herzegovina
 Božići, Montenegro, a village in Montenegro